Failure modes, effects, and diagnostic analysis (FMEDA) is a systematic analysis technique to obtain subsystem / product level failure rates, failure modes and diagnostic capability. The FMEDA technique considers:
 All components of a design,
 The functionality of each component, 
 The failure modes of each component,
 The effect of each component failure mode on the product functionality,
 The ability of any automatic diagnostics to detect the failure,
 The design strength (de-rating, safety factors) and
 The operational profile (environmental stress factors).

Given a component database calibrated with field failure data that is reasonably accurate, the method can predict product level failure rate and failure mode data for a given application. The predictions have been shown to be more accurate than field warranty return analysis or even typical field failure analysis given that these methods depend on reports that typically do not have sufficient detail information in failure records.

The abstract of an FMEDA report typically mentions the Safe Failure Fraction (rate of failures that are neither dangerous nor undetected over the total rate) and the Diagnostic Coverage (rate of detected dangerous failures over the rate of all dangerous failures). Each term is defined equivalently in both standards, IEC 61508 and ISO 13849.

The name was given by Dr. William M. Goble in 1994 to the technique that had been in development since 1988 by Dr. Goble and other engineers now at exida.

Antecedents 

A failure modes and effects analysis, FMEA, is a structured qualitative analysis of a system, subsystem, process, design or function to identify potential failure modes, their causes and their effects on (system) operation. The concept and practice of performing a FMEA, has been around in some form since the 1960s. The practice was first formalized in 1970s with the development of US MIL-STD-1629/1629A.
In early practice its use was limited to select applications and industries where cost of failure was particularly high. The primary benefits were to qualitatively evaluate the safety and reliability of a system, determine unacceptable failure modes, identify potential design improvements, plan maintenance activities and help understand system operation in the presence of potential faults. 
The failure modes, effects and criticality analysis (FMECA) was introduced to address a primary barrier to effective use of the detailed FMEA results by the addition of a criticality metric. This allowed users of the analysis to quickly focus on the most important failure modes/effects in terms of risk. This allowed prioritization to drive improvements based on cost / benefit comparisons.

Development 

The FMEDA technique was developed in the late 1980s by exida engineers based in part on a paper in the 1984 RAMS Symposium. The initial FMEDA added two additional pieces of information to the FMEA analysis process. The first piece of information added in an FMEDA is the quantitative failure data (failure rates and the distribution of failure modes) for all components being analyzed. The second piece of information added to an FMEDA is the probability of the system or subsystem to detect internal failures via automatic on-line diagnostics. This is crucial to achieving and maintaining reliability in increasingly complex systems and for systems that may not be fully exercising all functionality under normal circumstances such as a low demand Emergency Shutdown System, ESD System.
There is a clear need for a measurement of automatic diagnostic capability. This was recognized in the late 1980s In that context the principles and basic methods for the modern FMEDA were first documented in the book Evaluating Control System Reliability. The actual term FMEDA was first used in 1994 and after further refinement the methods were published in the late 1990s. The method was explained to members of the IEC 61508 committee in the late 90s and included in the standard as a method of determining failure rate, failure mode and diagnostic coverage for products.  FMEDA techniques have been further refined during the 2000s primarily during IEC 61508 preparation work. The key changes have been:
1.	Use of Functional Failure Modes;
2.	Mechanical Component Usage;
3.	Prediction of manual proof test effectiveness; and
4.	Prediction of product useful life.
With these changes, the FMEDA technique has matured to become more complete and useful.

Functional failure mode analysis 

Also in the early 2000s functional failure mode analysis was added to the FMEDA process by John C. Grebe. In early FMEDA work, component failure modes were mapped directly to "safe" or "dangerous" categories per IEC 61508. This was relatively easy since everything that was not "dangerous" was "safe." With multiple failure mode categories now existing, direct assignment became more difficult.  In addition, it became clear that the category assignment might change if a product were used in different applications. With direct failure mode category assignment during the FMEDA, a new FMEDA was required for each new application or each variation in usage.  
Under the functional failure mode approach, the actual functional failure modes of the product are identified during an FMEA. During the detailed FMEDA, each component failure mode is mapped to a functional failure mode. The functional failure modes are then categorized according to product failure mode in a particular application.  This eliminates the need for more detailed work when a new application is considered.

Mechanical FMEDA Techniques 

It became clear in the early 2000s that many products being used in safety critical applications had mechanical components. An FMEDA done without considering these mechanical components was incomplete, misleading, and potentially dangerous.  The fundamental problem in using the FMEDA technique was the lack of a mechanical component database that included part failure rates and failure mode distributions.
Using a number of published reference sources, exida began development of a mechanical component database in 2003. After a few years of research and refinement, the database has been published. This has allowed the FMEDA to be used on combination electrical / mechanical components and purely mechanical components.

Manual Proof Test Effectiveness 

The FMEDA can predict the effectiveness of any defined manual proof test in the same way it can predict automatic diagnostic coverage.  An additional column is added to the FMEDA and probability of detection for each component failure mode is estimated.  The cumulative effectiveness of the proof test is calculated in the same way as automatic diagnostic coverage.

Product Useful Life 

As each component within a product is reviewed, those with a relatively short useful life span are identified.  One example of this is an electrolytic capacitor.  Many designs have a useful life limitation of 10 years.  Since constant failure rates are only valid during the useful life period, this metric is valuable for interpreting FMEDA result limitations.

The Future 

Further refinement of the component database with selective calibration to different operation profiles is needed. In addition, comparisons of FMEDA results with field failure studies, have shown that human factors, especially maintenance procedures, affect the failure rates and failure modes of products.

As more data becomes available, the component database can be refined and updated. After a few years of research and refinement, the database has been published as required by new technology and new knowledge.  The success of the FMEDA technique is supplying needed data in a relatively accurate way has allowed the probabilistic, performance approach to design to work.

See also 

Reliability engineering
Design Review Based on Failure Mode
Failure mode
Failure rate
Fault Tree Analysis
FMECA
FMEA
Hazard analysis and critical control points
High availability
List of materials analysis methods
List of materials-testing resources
Process decision program chart
Risk assessment

References

Engineering failures
Reliability engineering
Survival analysis